Flying Frenchman is a nickname.

List 

People with this nickname include:

 Tariq Abdul-Wahad (born 1974), French basketball player and coach
 Édouard Carpentier (1926–2010), France-born Canadian pro-wrestler
 Leon Duray (1894–1956), U.S. racecar driver
 Claude Gnakpa (born 1983), French soccer player
 Guy Lafleur (1951–2022), Quebecois French-Canadian and Canadiens hockey player
 Leo Lafrance (1902–1993), Quebecois French-Canadian and Canadiens hockey player
 Newsy Lalonde (1887–1970), Franco-Ontarian French-Canadian and Canadiens hockey player
 Manu "Flying Frenchman" Lataste, a participant on the Go-Big Show talent show
 Dave McKigney (1932–1988), Canadian pro-wrestler with the ringname 'Flying Frenchman' Jacques Dubois
 Raphaël Poirée (born 1974), French biathlete
 Marcel Pronovost (1930–2015), Quebecois French-Canadian hockey player, nicknamed "Detroit's own Flying Frenchman"
 Franky Zapata (born 1978), French water powersportsman and inventor of the Flyboard hydroflight device

See also 

 The Flying Dutchman (nickname)
 Frenchman (disambiguation)
 Flying (disambiguation)

Nicknames in sports
Nicknames in association football
Nicknames in basketball